Karen Joy Fowler is an American author of science fiction, fantasy, and literary fiction. Her work often centers on the nineteenth century, the lives of women, and alienation.

She is best known as the author of the best-selling novel The Jane Austen Book Club that was made into a movie of the same name.

Biography
Fowler was born in Bloomington, Indiana, and spent the first eleven years of her life there. Her family then moved to Palo Alto, California. Fowler attended the University of California, Berkeley, and majored in political science. After having a child during the last year of her master's program, she spent seven years devoted to child-raising.  Feeling restless, Fowler decided to take a dance class, and then a creative writing class at the University of California, Davis.  Realizing that she was never going to make it as a dancer, Fowler began to publish science fiction stories, making a name for herself with the short story "Recalling Cinderella" (1985) in L Ron Hubbard Presents Writers of the Future Volume 1 (1985) and Artificial Things (1986), a collection of short stories.

Writing career

She began publishing sf with "Recalling Cinderella" in L Ron Hubbard Presents Writers of the Future, Vol I (anth 1985) edited by Algis Budrys

Her first novel, Sarah Canary (1991), was published to critical acclaim. The novel involves a group of people alienated by nineteenth century America experiencing a peculiar kind of first contact. One character is Chinese American, another putatively mentally ill, a third a feminist, and lastly Sarah herself, an extraterrestrial. Fowler meant for Sarah Canary to "read like a science fiction novel to a science fiction reader" and "like a mainstream novel to a mainstream reader." Fowler's intentions were to leave room for the readers’ own interpretation of the text.

James Tiptree, Jr. Award
Fowler also collaborated with Pat Murphy to found the James Tiptree, Jr. Award in 1991, a literary prize for science fiction or fantasy that "expands or explores our understanding of gender." The prize is named for science fiction author Alice Sheldon who wrote under the pen name James Tiptree, Jr. Fowler drew inspiration not only from Sheldon's work, but also from the fact that Sheldon's mother was an adventurer, going on several trips to Africa including a gorilla hunting expedition in 1920. As such, she serves as the inspiration for the protagonist in Fowler's "What I Didn't See."  The award's main focus is to recognize the authors, male or female, who challenge and reflect shifting gender roles.

Other genre works
Her other genre works also tended to focus on odd corners of the nineteenth century experiencing the unexpected or fantastic. Her second novel, The Sweetheart Season (1996) is a romantic comedy infused with historical and fantasy elements.

Her 1998 collection, Black Glass, won a World Fantasy Award, and her 2010 collection What I Didn't See, and Other Stories also won a World Fantasy Award.

Her 2004 novel The Jane Austen Book Club become a critical and popular success including being on The New York Times bestsellers list. Although it is not a science fiction or fantasy work, science fiction does play an integral part to the novel's plot.

Fowler was an instructor at the Clarion Workshop 2007 in San Diego. She was one of the two Guests of Honor at Readercon 2007.

In 2008, she won the Nebula Award for the second time for Best Short Story for her 2007 story "Always". Her short story "The Pelican Bar" won a Shirley Jackson Award in 2009 and a World Fantasy Award in 2010.

Fowler's novel, We Are All Completely Beside Ourselves (2013) won the Pen/Faulkner Award for 2014, and has been nominated for a 2014 Nebula Award as well. It was shortlisted for the 2014 Man Booker Prize.

She received a World Fantasy Life Achievement Award at the 2020 convention.

Fowler's most recent novel, [Booth], was longlisted for the 2022 Man Booker Prize.

"What I Didn't See"
Fowler was inspired to write her short story "What I Didn't See" after doing research about chimpanzees for her book We Are All Completely Beside Ourselves. During her research, Fowler came across an essay by Donna Haraway which discusses a 1920 expedition that was carried out by the curator of the New York National Museum of History. One of the men on the expedition wanted a woman in the group to kill a gorilla in order to ultimately protect these species. He reasoned that if women could carry out this action, gorillas would no longer be seen as a fearsome animal, and the thrill of killing them would be gone. Fowler's reaction was one of appalled interest, and she was inspired to write "What I Didn't See" by these findings. It won the short story Nebula Award in 2003.

Awards and honors

1985 Published Winner for "Recalling Cinderella," a new writer short story winner in L. Ron Hubbard Presents: Writer's of the Future Vol 1 edited by Algis Budrys
1998 World Fantasy Award for Black Glass, a collection of short stories.
2004 Nebula Award for "What I Didn't See", a short story.
2008 Nebula Award for "Always", a short story.
2009 Shirley Jackson Award for "The Pelican Bar", a short story
2010 World Fantasy Award for What I Didn't See, and Other Stories, a collection of short stories.
2014 PEN/Faulkner Award for Fiction for We Are All Completely Beside Ourselves, a novel.
2014 Specsavers National Book Awards "International Author of the Year" winner for We Are All Completely Beside Ourselves
2017 World Fantasy Award for The Best American Science Fiction and Fantasy 2016 for Best Anthology (nominee)

Bibliography

Novels
 Sarah Canary (1991) - novel concerning a mysterious woman in 1873 Pacific Northwest.
 The War of the Roses (1991) - Chapter book publication of the novelette.
 The Sweetheart Season (1996) - Fantasy novel about the Sweetwheat Sweethearts, a female baseball team from 1947 Minnesota.
 Sister Noon (2001)  - Novel set in 1890s San Francisco.
 The Jane Austen Book Club (2004)  - Six members of an early 21st-century book club discuss Jane Austen books.
 Wit's End (Putnam, 2008)  - A young woman visits her godmother, one of America's most successful mystery writers.
 We Are All Completely Beside Ourselves (A Marian Wood Book/Putnam, 2013)  - 2014 PEN/Faulkner Award for Fiction Winner, shortlisted for the 2014 Man Booker Prize
 Booth (Putnam, 2022)  - The story of the family of Shakespearean actors best known for their connection to Lincoln's assassin John Wilkes Booth. Longlisted for the 2022 Booker Prize.

Collections
 Artificial Things (1986) - collection of 13 short stories.
 Peripheral Vision (1990) - collection of 5 stories, 1 original. Author's Choice Monthly #6
 Letters from Home (1991) with Pat Cadigan and Pat Murphy. Collection of short fiction by Fowler, Cadigan, and Murphy.
 Black Glass (1997)  - collection of 15 short stories, 2 original. Includes the contents from Peripheral Vision and Letters from Home.
 What I Didn't See and Other Stories (2010)  - collection of 12 short stories, 1 original.

As editor
 MOTA 3: Courage (2003) - anthology of short fiction.
 The James Tiptree Award Anthology 1 (2005), with Debbie Notkin, Pat Murphy and Jeffrey D. Smith.  Anthology of winners of the James Tiptree, Jr. Award. Tachyon Publications.
 The James Tiptree Award Anthology 2 (2006), with Debbie Notkin, Pat Murphy and Jeffrey D. Smith. Tachyon Publications.
 The James Tiptree Award Anthology 3 (2007), with Debbie Notkin, Pat Murphy and Jeffrey D. Smith. Tachyon Publications.

References

External links 
 

Book Reporter, biography
The James Tiptree, Jr. Award Home Page
Karen Joy Fowler interview with WritersNewsWeekly.com

1950 births
Living people
20th-century American novelists
21st-century American novelists
American fantasy writers
American science fiction writers
American women novelists
PEN/Faulkner Award for Fiction winners
Nebula Award winners
John W. Campbell Award for Best New Writer winners
Palo Alto High School alumni
People from Davis, California
Women science fiction and fantasy writers
World Fantasy Award-winning writers
Writers from Bloomington, Indiana
20th-century American women writers
21st-century American women writers
University of California, Davis alumni
Novelists from California
Novelists from Indiana
Weird fiction writers